Rubiães is a civil parish in the municipality of Paredes de Coura, Portugal. The population in 2011 was 512, in an area of 9.08 km².

Sites of interests
Igreja de São Pedro de Rubiães
Roman road from Braga to Tui 
Ponte de Rubiães (Roman)
Solar das Antas

References

Freguesias of Paredes de Coura